Andechy is a commune in the Somme department in Hauts-de-France in northern France.

Geography

History
The village was completely destroyed during World War I.

Population

See also
Communes of the Somme department

References

Communes of Somme (department)